"We Still in This Bitch" is a song by American hip hop recording artist B.o.B, released on December 30, 2012 as the first single from his third studio album Underground Luxury (2013). The song, produced by Mike WiLL Made It and Marz, features guest appearances from fellow Southern rappers T.I. and Juicy J. The song initially appeared on B.o.B's ninth mixtape, entitled Fuck 'Em We Ball, which was released on November 15, 2012.

Music video
The music video, directed by Decatur Dan, premiered on MTV on January 13, 2013.

Chart performance

Weekly charts

Year-end charts

Certifications

References

2012 songs
B.o.B songs
Juicy J songs
T.I. songs
Grand Hustle Records singles
Atlantic Records singles
Song recordings produced by Mike Will Made It
Songs written by B.o.B
Songs written by T.I.
Songs written by Juicy J
Songs written by Mike Will Made It
2013 singles
Trap music songs